This is a list of Recipients of the Order of the Golden Ruler. The Order of the Golden Ruler was an Order of chivalry of Korean Empire which was part of the Gwangmu Reform, which modernized the Korean Empire. The order was given to the Imperial Family who will be throned and the family's relatives, officials and soldiers as the will of the Emperor.

References

Korean awards
Korean Empire